Stéphane Ferrara (born 25 December 1956) is a French actor and boxer. He appeared in more than sixty films since 1982.

Selected filmography

References

External links 

1956 births
Living people
French male film actors
French male boxers
French people of Italian descent